The Denmark national beach handball team is the national team of Denmark. It is governed by the Danish Handball Federation and takes part in international beach handball competitions.

World Championships results
2012 – 5th place
2014 – 4th place
2018 – 7th place
2022 – Qualified

References

External links
Official website
IHF profile

Beach handball
National beach handball teams
Beach handball